A cubic fathom or intaken piled fathom (IPF) was a measure of volume used for the shipment of pit props.  A fathom was six feet and so this was equivalent to 216 cubic feet.

See also
 Board foot
 Standard (timber unit)

References

Customary units of measurement
Units of volume